Anaerolinea thermophila is a species of filamentous thermophilic bacteria, the type and only species of its genus. It is Gram-negative, non-spore-forming, with type strain UNI-1T (=JCM 11387T =DSM 14523T).

References

Further reading

Satyanarayana, Tulasi, Jennifer Littlechild, and Yutaka Kawarabayasi. "Thermophilic Microbes in Environmental and Industrial Biotechnology."
Stroo, Hans F., Andrea Leeson, and C. Herb Ward, eds. Bioaugmentation for Groundwater Remediation. Vol. 5. Springer, 2012.

External links

LPSN
Type strain of Anaerolinea thermophila at BacDive -  the Bacterial Diversity Metadatabase

Chloroflexota
Thermophiles
Gram-negative bacteria
Bacteria described in 2003